Maromandia is a town and commune in Madagascar. It belongs to the district of Analalava, which is a part of Sofia Region. The population of the commune was estimated to be approximately 34,000 in 2001 commune census.

Geographie
It is situated at the Route nationale 6.

Education
Primary and junior level secondary education are available in town. The majority 60% of the population of the commune are farmers, while an additional 18% receives their livelihood from raising livestock. The most important crops are rice and coffee; also seeds of catechu are an important agricultural product. Services provide employment for 2% of the population. Additionally fishing employs 20% of the population.

References and notes 

Populated places in Sofia Region